The 22883 / 84   Garib Rath Express is a Superfast Express train of the Garib Rath series belonging to Indian Railways - East Coast Railway zone that runs between  and  in India.

It is part of the Garib Rath Express series launched by the former railway minister of India, Mr. Laloo Prasad Yadav

Coaches

The 22883 / 84   Garib Rath Express has 16 AC 3 tier & 2 End on Generator Coaches. It does not carry a Pantry car coach and its rakes are shared with 12881/82 Puri Howrah Garib Rath Express

As is customary with most train services in India, Coach Composition may be amended at the discretion of Indian Railways depending on demand.

Service

As the average speed of the train is above , as per Indian Railways rules, its fare includes a Superfast surcharge.

Route

The 22883 / 84   Garib Rath Express runs from 

ODISHA
 
 
 
 

ANDHRA PRADESH
 
 
 
 
 
 
 
 
 
 
 
 
 
 
 
 Diguvametta
 
 
 
 
 

KARNATAKA
 
 
.

Traction

As the route is fully electrified and a   based WAP 7 pulls up to  later that Lallaguda based WAP 7 locomotive powers the train up to its destination.

Operation

22883   Garib Rath Express leaves  every Friday & arriving  the next day.
 
22884   Garib Rath Express leaves  every Saturday & arriving  the next day.

References

External links
22883 Garib Rath Express at India Rail Info
22884 Garib Rath Express at India Rail Info

Transport in Puri
Transport in Bangalore
Garib Rath Express trains
Rail transport in Odisha
Rail transport in Andhra Pradesh
Rail transport in Karnataka
Railway services introduced in 2012